Lac d'Antre is a lake above Villards-d'Héria, in the Jura department of France.

Antre